The making of local Tamil-language films its motherland of Tamil Nadu is actively growing in Malaysia. With the Tamil diaspora worldwide, there are many enthusiastic filmmakers who want to make their mark.

Malaysia's first Tamil film is known to be Ratha Paei, starring Kalaikkumar Chinnasamy, Susheela Devi, Sivaji Raja, M. Baharudeen, Mukesh, Vijaya Gowri and Malaysia Vasudevan. It was shot in Golden Studio, Chennai and directed by Mooban. Music and background score of the film was composed by G. K. Venkatesh. Shooting of the film began in 1968 and it was released on 14 January 1969.

Centered in Kuala Lumpur, Penang and Johor Bahru, the industry remained relatively small with fewer films produced. The industry is growing and faces strong competition from Tamil films from Kollywood.

Highest-grossing movies

List of Tamil films from Malaysia by year
Below is a list of Tamil language films produced in Malaysia. The total grosses of the films are in Ringgit Malaysia, and the source is FINAS.

2023

2022

2021

2020

2019

2018

2017

2016

2015

2014

2013

2012

2011

2000 – 2010

1990s

1960s

Notable cast members

Actors
 Mugen Rao
 Yuvaraj Krishnaswamy
 Ben G
 Ravin Rao Santheran

Actresses
 Shalini Balasundaram
 Haanii Shivraj (1991–2014)
 Nithya Shree
 'Punnagai Poo' Gheetha
 Pushpa Narayan
 Sangeeta Krishnasamy
 Shuba Jay (1976–2014)

Directors
 Shalini Balasundaram
 V. Nagaraj
 Perakas Rajaram
 Prem Nath
 Bala Ganapathi William
 Praboo Ariva
 Vimala Perumal

References

Cinema of Malaysia
Tamil cinema
Tamil diaspora in Malaysia